Dasse is a surname. Notable people with the surname include:

Bonnie Dasse (born 1959), American shot putter
Claude Dasse (born 1964), French bobsledder
Stéphane Agbre Dasse (born 1989), Burkinabé footballer

See also
Hasse